Surna may refer to:
Surna (Norway), a river in Møre og Romsdal county, Norway
Zurna or Surna, a multinational outdoor wind instrument
Sorna or Surna, an ancient Iranian woodwind instrument
Surna River, a river in Nepal